The chief of staff of the Army (CSA) is a statutory position in the United States Army held by a general officer. As the highest-ranking officer assigned to serve in the Department of the Army, the chief is the principal military advisor and a deputy to the secretary of the Army. In a separate capacity, the CSA is a member of the Joint Chiefs of Staff and, thereby, a military advisor to the National Security Council, the secretary of defense, and the president of the United States. The CSA is typically the highest-ranking officer on active duty in the U.S. Army unless the chairman or the vice chairman of the Joint Chiefs of Staff are Army officers.

The chief of staff of the Army is an administrative position based in the Pentagon. While the CSA does not have operational command authority over Army forces proper (which is within the purview of the Combatant Commanders who report to the Secretary of Defense), the CSA does exercise supervision of army units and organizations as the designee of the Secretary of the Army.

The 40th and current Chief of Staff of the Army is General James C. McConville.

Appointment 
The chief of staff of the Army is nominated by for appointment by the president, for a four-year term of office, and must be confirmed by the Senate. The chief can be reappointed to serve one additional term, but only during times of war or national emergency declared by Congress. By statute, the chief is appointed as a four-star general.

The chief has an official residence, Quarters 1 at Joint Base Myer–Henderson Hall, Virginia.

Responsibilities 
The senior leadership of the Department of the Army consists of two civilians—the secretary of the Army (head of the department and subordinate to the secretary of defense) and the under secretary of the Army—and two military officers—the chief of staff of the Army and the vice chief of staff of the Army.

The chief reports directly to the secretary of the Army for army matters and assists in the Secretary's external affairs functions, including presenting and enforcing army policies, plans, and projections. The chief also directs the inspector general of the Army to perform inspections and investigations as required. In addition, the chief presides over the Army Staff and represents Army capabilities, requirements, policy, plans, and programs in Joint forums. Under delegation of authority made by the secretary of the Army, the chief designates army personnel and army resources to the commanders of the unified combatant commands. The chief performs all other functions enumerated in  under the authority, direction, and control of the Secretary of the Army, or delegates those duties and responsibilities to other officers in his administration in his name. Like the other service counterparts, the chief has no operational command authority over army forces, dating back to the passage of the Department of Defense Reorganization Act of 1958. The chief is served by a number of Deputy Chiefs of Staff of the Army, such as G-1, Personnel. The chief's base pay is $21,147.30 per month and also received a Personal Money Allowance (Monthly Amount) of $333.33, a basic allowance for subsistence of $253.38, and a basic allowance for housing from $50.70 to $1923.30.

History 
Until 1903, the senior military officer in the army was the Commanding General of the United States Army, who reported to the Secretary of War. From 1864 to 1865, Major General Henry Halleck (who had previously been Commanding General) served as "Chief of Staff of the Army" under the Commanding General, Lieutenant General Ulysses S. Grant, thus serving in a different office and not as the senior officer in the army.

The first chief of staff moved his headquarters to Fort Myer in 1908.

List of chiefs of staff of the Army
The rank listed is the rank when serving in the office.

Timeline

See also
 Vice Chief of Staff of the United States Army
 Army Staff Senior Warrant Officer
 Sergeant Major of the Army

References

Citations

Notes

Sources

Further reading
 Hewes, Jr., James E. From Root to McNamara: Army Organization and Administration, 1900–1963 (1975) .

 Semsch, Philip L. "Elihu Root and the General Staff." Military Affairs (1963): 16-27.
 Skowronek, Stephen. Building a New American State: The Expansion of National Administrative Capacities, 1877–1920 (Cambridge University Press, 1982) pp 212-247.
 - full text
 White, Richard D. "Civilian management of the military: Elihu Root and the 1903 reorganization of the army general staff." Journal of Management History (1998) 4#1 (1998), pp. 43-59.

External links
 

Joint Chiefs of Staff
United States Army organization
United States
1903 establishments in the United States